Ingrid Steen (born December 12, 1967 in Trondheim) is a Norwegian team handball player and Olympic medalist. She received silver medals at the 1988 Summer Olympics in Seoul with the Norwegian national team, and at the 1992 Summer Olympics in Barcelona. Ingrid Steen played 161 games for the national team during her career, scoring 588 goals.

References

External links

1967 births
Living people
Norwegian female handball players
Olympic silver medalists for Norway
Olympic handball players of Norway
Handball players at the 1988 Summer Olympics
Handball players at the 1992 Summer Olympics
Sportspeople from Trondheim
Olympic medalists in handball
Medalists at the 1992 Summer Olympics
Medalists at the 1988 Summer Olympics